

237001–237100 

|-bgcolor=#f2f2f2
| colspan=4 align=center | 
|}

237101–237200 

|-id=164
| 237164 Keelung ||  || Keelung City is located at the northernmost tip of Taiwan. This port city is bordered by mountains on three sides and faces out towards the sea. Keelung enjoys an excellent natural harbor with deep water. || 
|-id=187
| 237187 Zhonglihe ||  || Chung Li-ho (1915–1960), a Taiwanese writer. Also known as "Zhong Li-he" or "Chung Li-ho", he is known for his novels about southern Taiwan's farming communities and their social transition in the early 20th century. || 
|}

237201–237300 

|-id=265
| 237265 Golobokov ||  || Gennady G. Golobokov (1935–1978), a talented fiction-artist, bed-ridden for 26 years following a spinal injury. || 
|-id=276
| 237276 Nakama ||  || Nakama is a Japanese word meaning a group of persons who spontaneously come together and work for common purposes in education, community services, and other fields of work. || 
|-id=277
| 237277 Nevaruth ||  || Neva Ruth Daniel (1910–2000), a loving mother of three, was a gifted teacher of English and literature at Colorado Mountain College and a teacher of the Progoff System of Intensive Journal Writing. || 
|}

237301–237400 

|-bgcolor=#f2f2f2
| colspan=4 align=center | 
|}

237401–237500 

|-bgcolor=#f2f2f2
| colspan=4 align=center | 
|}

237501–237600 

|-bgcolor=#f2f2f2
| colspan=4 align=center | 
|}

237601–237700 

|-id=693
| 237693 Anakovacicek ||  || Ana Kovacicek (1938–2021) was a teacher of mathematics and physics from Zagreb. She was awarded for her contribution to astronomy education in Croatia. || 
|}

237701–237800 

|-bgcolor=#f2f2f2
| colspan=4 align=center | 
|}

237801–237900 

|-id=845
| 237845 Neris ||  || Neris, also known as Vilija, is the second longest river in Lithuania. || 
|}

237901–238000 

|-bgcolor=#f2f2f2
| colspan=4 align=center | 
|}

References 

237001-238000